Rig Safar (also Romanized as Rīg Şafar) is a village in Zarabad-e Gharbi Rural District, Zarabad District, Konarak County, Sistan and Baluchestan Province, Iran. At the 2006 census, its population was 55, in 10 families.

References 

Populated places in Konarak County